Danzón  is a 1991 Mexican drama film directed by María Novaro. It is the story of Julia (Rojo), a telephone switchboard operator whose main joy is Danzón dancing.

Plot 
Julia (María Rojo) is a switchboard operator in Mexico City who lives for her job, her daughter and danzón. She is a strict and expert danzón dancer.

In the last six years, Julia has danced with Carmelo (Daniel Rergis), a tall and silent man, in the Salón Colonia every Wednesday. However, they barely have spoken to each other off the dance floor. One night, Carmelo disappears without a trace. Julia realized how important he became in her life. Lonely and sad, Julia takes a train to Veracruz, where she knows Carmelo has a brother. That trip changes her life, becoming a journey of self-discovering.

Awards

Cast 
 María Rojo as Julia Solórzano
 Carmen Salinas as Doña Tí

References

External links 
 
 

Mexican drama films
1991 drama films
1990s Mexican films